Andreas Panayiotou (born 27 December 1966) is a Cypriot former football defender.

He started his career in 1987 with Anorthosis Famagusta. He also played for AEK Larnaca and Anagennisi Dherynia. He appeared in the UEFA Cup and the qualifying rounds of the Champions League for Anorthosis and in the Cup Winners' Cup for Larnaca.

References

1966 births
Living people
Cypriot footballers
Association football defenders
Anorthosis Famagusta F.C. players
AEK Larnaca FC players
Anagennisi Deryneia FC players